The following is an incomplete list of current and defunct magazines published in Lithuania. They are published in Lithuanian or other languages.

A
 Aidai

C
 Centras

I
 Iliustruotasis mokslas

L
 Laima

M
 Magazyn Wilenski
 Mūsų senovė

N
 Namas ir aš

P
 Panelė
 Pergalė
 Pravda

S
 SPO:)

V
 Valstybė
 Veidas

See also
List of newspapers in Lithuania

References

Lithuania
Magazines